Benigno Quezada Naranjo (born 18 June 1962) is a Mexican politician from the National Action Party. From 2009 to 2012 he served as Deputy of the LXI Legislature of the Mexican Congress representing Michoacán. He previously served in the Congress of Michoacán and as municipal president of Peribán, Michoacán.

References

1962 births
Living people
Politicians from Michoacán
National Action Party (Mexico) politicians
21st-century Mexican politicians
Members of the Congress of Michoacán
Deputies of the LXI Legislature of Mexico
Members of the Chamber of Deputies (Mexico) for Michoacán
Municipal presidents in Michoacán